Leočina is a settlement in the Skenderaj municipality in Kosovo. The rural settlement lies on a cadastral area with the same name, of 784 hectares. It lies 702 m over sea level. The village has an Albanian majority and Serbian minority; in the 1991 census, it had 1069 inhabitants.

Geography
It lies in the hilly region of Drenica.

History
The Church of St. John, which lies on the cemetery, was built in the village in the 14th century, and reconstructed in the 16th century. Until latter the half of the 19th century it was known as the Church of St. Nicholas. It was expertly conserved and reconstructed in 1967 and is protected by the Republic of Serbia. There exist remains of another 14th-century church, the so-called "Kaluđerska-" or "Preobraška crkva" and one more church, a total of three.

On the night of May 19, 1998, members of the Albanian Kosovo Liberation Army kidnapped Dostan Šmigić (aged 41), a worker in the institute for labour market in Skenderaj, on the Čitak-Leočina road and took him to an unknown location.

Notes

References

Sources

Tatomir Vukanović, Drenica: The Second Serbian Holy Mountain, III Edition, Public and University Library "Ivo Andrić" (Priština), Mnemosyne Center, Belgrade 2005; anthropogeographical and ethnological field research conducted by ethnologist Tatomir Vukanović (1907-1997) between 1934 and 1937.

Villages in Skenderaj
Medieval Serbian sites in Kosovo